Ness City is a city in and the county seat of Ness County, Kansas, United States.  As of the 2020 census, the population of the city was 1,329.  Ness City is famous for its four-story Old Ness County Bank Building located downtown, and nicknamed Skyscraper of the Plains.

History
Ness City was founded in 1878. The town experienced growth with the arrival of the railroad in 1886.

Geography
Ness City is located at  (38.452250, -99.905989).

Climate
Ness City has a humid subtropical climate (Köppen Cwa), with hot, humid summers and cold, dry winters. On average, January is the coldest month, and July is both the hottest month and the wettest month.

Rainfall, although sometimes scarce, is high enough to avoid an semi-arid steppe climate. Ness City receives  of precipitation during an average year.

Demographics

2010 census
As of the census of 2010, there were 1,449 people, 635 households, and 392 families residing in the city. The racial makeup of the city was 97.0% White, 0.3% African American, 0.1% Native American, 0.2% Asian, 1.6% from other races, and 0.8% from two or more races. Hispanic or Latino of any race were 8.9% of the population.

There were 635 households, of which 26.5% had children under the age of 18 living with them, 52.9% were married couples living together, 5.5% had a female householder with no husband present, 3.3% had a male householder with no wife present, and 38.3% were non-families. 35.9% of all households were made up of individuals, and 17.1% had someone living alone who was 65 years of age or older. The average household size was 2.21 and the average family size was 2.85.

The median age in the city was 47.5 years. 23% of residents were under the age of 18; 4.8% were between the ages of 18 and 24; 19.2% were from 25 to 44; 27.7% were from 45 to 64; and 25.3% were 65 years of age or older. The gender makeup of the city was 49.1% male and 50.9% female.

2000 census
As of the census of 2000, there were 1,534 people, 684 households, and 424 families residing in the city. The racial makeup of the city was 97.72% White, 0.07% African American, 0.39% Native American, 0.07% Asian, 0.59% from other races, and 1.17% from two or more races. Hispanic or Latino of any race were 2.28% of the population.

There were 684 households, out of which 25.3% had children under the age of 18 living with them, 55.0% were married couples living together, 4.7% had a female householder with no husband present, and 38.0% were non-families. 36.0% of all households were made up of individuals, and 20.3% had someone living alone who was 65 years of age or older. The average household size was 2.17 and the average family size was 2.83.

In the city, the population was spread out, with 22.4% under the age of 18, 5.0% from 18 to 24, 24.6% from 25 to 44, 22.2% from 45 to 64, and 25.9% who were 65 years of age or older. The median age was 44 years. For every 100 females, there were 93.0 males. For every 100 females age 18 and over, there were 87.9 males.

The median income for a household in the city was $33,068, and the median income for a family was $42,500. Males had a median income of $28,992 versus $18,553 for females. The per capita income for the city was $18,481. About 5.1% of families and 7.5% of the population were below the poverty line, including 9.1% of those under age 18 and 6.8% of those age 65 or over.

References

Further reading

External links

 City of Ness City
 Ness City - Directory of Public Officials
 USD 303, local school district
 Sacred Heart Catholic School, local Catholic school, grades PreK-8
 Ness city map, KDOT

Cities in Kansas
County seats in Kansas
Cities in Ness County, Kansas